Ellam Inba Mayam is a 1955 Indian Tamil-language drama film directed by Jitten Banerji. The film stars T. R. Ramachandran, K. A. Thangavelu, Ragini and Rajasulochana. It was released on 1 April 1955.

Plot

Cast 
List compiled from the films song book

Male Cast
 T. R. Ramachandran as Ganesh
 K. A. Thangavelu as Sambandam
 T. K. Ramachandran as Rathnam
 Friend Ramasamy as Chakrapani
 T. N. Sivathanu as Govindara
 N. S. Narayana Pillai as Neelakantan
 M. N. Krishnan as Ramu
 M. S. Karuppaiya as Anamalai
 V. P. S. Mani as Tharumalingam
 Krishnamoorthi as Muthu

Female cast
 Lalitha, Padmini as Guest artistes
 Ragini as Bhanu
 Rajasulochana as Vasantha
 Lakshmiprabha as Bhagyam
 K. N. Kamalam as Thripuram
 Dhanam as Seetha

Soundtrack 
Music was composed by Ghantasala while the lyrics were penned by K. P. Kamatchisundaram, Kuyilan, V. Seetharaman and Thanjai Ramaiah Dass.

References

External links 

1950s Tamil-language films
1955 drama films
Films scored by Ghantasala (musician)
Indian drama films